Jean-Charles Naouri (born 8 March 1949 in Bône, Algeria) is a French businessman. He is Chairman, Chief Executive Officer and controlling shareholder of Groupe Casino.

Education 
Naouri received his baccalaureat degree at only 15 years old. He then studied in classes préparatoires at the Lycée Louis-le-Grand before entering the École Normale Supérieure in 1967.  He also attended Harvard University, before returning in France and completing a PhD in Mathematics in only one year. He is also an alumnus of the Ecole Nationale d’Administration (1974-1976).

Early career

Civil servant 

After graduating from ENA in 1976, Jean-Charles Naouri joined the Inspection générale des finances (France), the auditing and supervisory body of the French Administration. From 1982 to 1986, he served as chief of staff for Pierre Bérégovoy, both at the Ministry of Social Affairs and National Solidarity and the Ministry of Economy, Finance and Budget.  During this period, he was the architect of the reforms implemented in the French financial markets, which included the creation of the MATIF futures and MONEP options markets and the introduction of certificates of deposit and commercial paper. In particular, he helped drive the financial market liberalization with measures to ease currency controls and eliminate credit restrictions.

Rothschild & Cie Banque 

In 1987, Jean-Charles Naouri left government service and joined Rothschild & Cie Banque as Managing Partner. Around the same time, he established his own investment fund,  Euris, which acquired minority equity investments in industrial companies, while increasing its investment capabilities.

Global retailing

Rallye 

In 1991 he acquired the Brittany-based retailer Rallye, which at the time was facing serious cash flow issues/challenges. Convinced of the future potential for retailing and the benefits of combining the two companies, in 1992 he engineered a merger of Rallye with Groupe Casino, thereby becoming Groupe Casino's largest shareholder.

Groupe Casino 

In 1997, a hostile takeover bid for Groupe Casino by rival retailer Promodès was thwarted by the successful counter offer  from Jean-Charles Naouri, the Guichard family and Casino management, thereby maintaining the Group's independence.

In March 2005, Jean-Charles Naouri became Chairman and Chief Executive Officer of Casino Group, 

In France, Jean-Charles Naouri has refocused French operations in the convenience format segment, Groupe Casino's core business, and also positioned Casino in the discount segment by developing the Leader Price chain and the Cdiscount e-commerce website acquired in 2000.

In 2012, Groupe Casino acquired a controlling interest in Brazilian retailer Pão de Açúcar, the country's largest private-sector employer. The Group also purchased the 50% of French retailer Monoprix, which it did not already own, becoming the sole shareholder.

In addition to his business activities, Jean-Charles Naouri is also the founder of the Euris Foundation, which he created in 2000. Each year, the Foundation grants 40 scholarships to promising high school graduates from impoverished neighbourhoods in France.

He is also Vice Chairman of the Groupe Casino corporate foundation, which he founded in 2009 to improve access to culture and knowledge for children who are disadvantaged or suffering from illness.
In addition, he is Honorary Chairman and Trustee of Ecole Normale Supérieure's Institut d’Expertise et de Prospective, which is responsible for developing ties between the school and the corporate world.

In June 2013, Jean-Charles Naouri was appointed by France's Ministry of Foreign Affairs to be a special representative for Economic relations with Brazil.

Positions 

 Chairman and Chief Executive Officer of Groupe Casino, a listed company
 Chairman of the Board of Cnova N.V.
 Chairman and Chief Executive Officer of Euris
 Chairman of Rallye, a listed company
 Chairman of the Board of Directors of Companhia Brasileira de Distribuicao (CBD), a listed company
 Vice-Chairman of the Casino Group Corporate Foundation
 CEO of Casino Finance
 Chairman of the Euris Foundation

Other positions 

 Board Member of Financière Marc de Lacharrière (FIMALAC)
 Member of the Advisory Committee of Banque de France
 Chairman of Association Promotion des Talents, a non-profit organisation
 Honorary Chairman and Director of Institut d’Expertise et de Prospective (Ecole Normale Supérieure)

References 

Groupe Casino
1949 births
Living people
French chief executives
École Normale Supérieure alumni
École nationale d'administration alumni
Grand Officiers of the Légion d'honneur